Manuela Lavinas Picq (born in France in 1977) is a Franco-Brazilian radical feminist academic, journalist, and political activist. She is married to Yaku Pérez Guartambel, a prominent Ecuadorian indigenous rights activist and politician.

Biography 
Picq attended the University of Miami, where she received a PhD in International Law. In 2003, she served as foreign affairs specialist for Republican Governor Jeb Bush of Florida and was a co-coordinator of civil society participation for the Free Trade Area of the Americas (FTAA) ministerial meeting.

In 2004, Picq moved to Ecuador, where she would serve in an academic capacity at Universidad San Francisco de Quito, 2016 she was awarded for her anti-correista activism with a scholarship as a "human rights defender", and two years later by the publication Global Americans, sponsored by the National Endowment for Democracy. In 2005, she was member of Front Line Defenders, an NGO funded by the European Union, Taiwan, the Ford Foundation and the Open Society Foundations. 

Picq was a regular contributor to Al Jazeera English between 2011 and 2014, where she published revelations about corruption within the Rafael Correa government, including the Glas Viejó case, in which the father of Vice President Jorge Glas was involved.

On August 21, 2013, Picq married in an indigenous ceremony Yaku Pérez Guartambel, who was serving as president of the ECUARUNARI. Two years later, during the 2015 protests, she was arrested by police at a demonstration, and her visa was canceled the next day by Rafael Correa's Ecuadorian government. Picq fled the country on August 21 as a result of "legal limbo".

After leaving Ecuador, Picq joined the Academics at Risk association, and would receive a short scholarship at the Free University of Berlin and is a visiting professor at Amherst College. Picq returned to Ecuador on January 15, 2018, following the inauguration of Lenín Moreno as President.

References

External links 

 Picq's Al Jazeera articles
 Picq's biography as a visiting professor at Amherst College in Massachusetts, USA, with links to some of her academic publications.
 Picq's page as a professor at the Universidad San Francisco de Quito.
 Article about Picq in Nueva Mujer magazine].

1977 births
Living people
Place of birth missing (living people)
French feminists